The Freeep is an EP from musical Indie group Matt Pond PA. Originally released for free, the EP was available as a direct download from the band's website. It has since been removed, but on September 1, 2009, it was released for sale as a digital download, via iTunes and Amazon MP3, with the new title Auri Sacra Fames.

Track listing
 "Hearts and Minds" – 2:38
 "Our Braided Lives" – 4:16
 "Five" – 1:51
 "One and Only" – 4:26
 "Imperfect" – 3:55
 "Three" – 3:04
 "First Light" – 3:58
 "Amazing Life" – 4:33
 "One" – 2:35

References

2008 EPs
Matt Pond PA EPs